Unforgettable is a 2014 Bollywood drama film directed by Arshad Yusuf Pathan. The film stars Mohammed Iqbal Khan, Alka Verma and Hazel Crowney in lead roles. The film is based and shot in Dubai. It is a love story of Anand who is a car racer who loses his eyesight. Sujeet Shetty has scored the film's music. The film was released in India on 13 June 2014

Cast
 Mohammed Iqbal Khan as Anand
 Alka Verma as Tara
 Hazel Crowney as Nisha
 Kiran Kumar as Vijay
 Shahbaz Khan as Munshiji
 Usha Bachani as Nirmala
 Niall O'Brien as Niall O'Brien
 William Porterfield as Williams
 Armeena Khan as Ghazal Singer
 Sachin Khurana as Sameer

Original soundtrack

Unforgettable's music is composed by Sujeet Shetty.

References

External links
 

2014 films
2010s Hindi-language films